Peking Express  is a 1951 American film-noir crime thriller action adventure film made by Paramount Pictures. It is the second remake of Paramount's earlier Shanghai Express (1932), remade as Night Plane from Chungking (1943) and the first film to be set in the newly emerged People's Republic of China (PRC). It was directed by William Dieterle and produced by Hal B. Wallis, from a screenplay by John Meredyth Lucas, based on the original screenplay by Jules Furthman and Harry Hervey. The film stars Joseph Cotten, Corinne Calvet and Edmund Gwenn with Marvin Miller.

Peking Express is notable for its production values. The music score was composed by Dimitri Tiomkin, the cinematography was by Charles Lang, the art direction by Franz Bachelin and Hal Pereira and the costume design by Edith Head.

Plot
Doctor Michael Bachlin (Joseph Cotten), is in Shanghai investigating a missing shipment of medical supplies for the United Nation's World Health Organization. He must travel to Peking on the express train with other passengers, Father Joseph Murray (Edmund Gwenn), and Kwon (Marvin Miller), a mysterious businessman. Just before the train leaves, Kwon's son, Ti Shen (Robert W. Lee), attempts to board, but his mother, Li Eiu (Soo Yong), has him arrested by Nationalist agents, before boarding the train herself.

Another passenger is nightclub singer and former lover, Danielle Grenier (Corinne Calvet) who Michael met earlier in Paris. Kwon invites her and Michael to join him in the dining car. Father Murray gets into an argument with a reporter, Wong (Benson Fong), an ardent Communist who also clashes with Michael. Danielle tells Michael after they broke up, she married but her husband died a year after.

Li Eiu who shares Danielle's compartment is found beaten by her husband. The next day, when the train stops to pick up soldiers, Kwon passes a message to a vendor. Michael wants to resume their romance but Danielle hesitates, saying she has been involve with too many others. Li Eiu is discovered with a knife wound, although Kwon claims she attempted suicide, but Michael is suspicious after seeing her beating.

Forced to halt by a blocked rail line, the train is attacked by counter-revolutionary forces with the soldiers on board surrendering, but summarily shot. Michael, Danielle, Murphy and Wong learn Kwon is the attackers' leader who has the passengers driven to a nearby farm house. Kwon, once a Communist, now deals in the black market, including stealing precious medical supplies Michael is trying to recover. Kwon knows Michael is going to Peking to treat a high-ranking general. Kwon forces Michael to contact Peking offering to release the train and its passengers in exchange for this son being freed.

Michael arranges for Kwon's son to be flown to the farm hideout. Complicating matters, Danielle confesses to Michael she was a spy and her late husband was a Communist.  The arrangement for release of the hostage and train is dependent on Peking bringing Ti Shen, without the aircraft being following to Kwon's base. When Wong confronts Kwon about his treachery, the reporter is tortured with his hands burned with a poker. After Ti Shen arrives, the pilot radios Peking that he will leave at dawn with Michael, but Kwon shoots and kills the pilot, reneging on the deal.

Michael treats Wong's wounds, and tells Ti Shen his father has tried to kill his mother who has been frightened by her husband's actions and his influence over Ti Shen. Kwon wants Danielle for himself, sending Michael  and Father Murray back to the train. Li Eiu confronts her husband, stabbing Kwon, before succumbing to her own wounds. Before dying, she begs her son to help Michael and the others escape.

Under guard by Father Murray, Michael brings Ti Shen with him and tries to find Danielle, who has already returned to the farmhouse. Michael ties up Ti Shen, returns to Kwon's base, shooting two guards and taking Danielle away. At the train, Wong joins two soldiers in a jeep, and throws a hand grenade, which wounds Father Murray. Michael returns fire with a machine gun, killing the attackers.

As the train gathers speed, more soldiers are in pursuit, but Ti Shen decides to help Michael, firing at the soldiers but is shot. As he dies, he reveals where the stolen medicine shipment can be found. Michael, Danielle and Father Murray are finally able to make good their escape.

Cast

 Joseph Cotten as Michael Bachlin
 Corinne Calvet as Danielle Grenier
 Edmund Gwenn as Father Joseph Murray
 Marvin Miller as Kwon
 Benson Fong as Wong
 Soo Yong as Li Eiu
 Robert W. Lee as Ti Shen
 Gregory Gay as Stanislaus
 Victor Sen Yung as Chinese captain
 Harold Fong as Ticket clerk
 Peter Chong as Restaurant car steward
 Eddie Lee as Chinese policeman
 Beal Wong as Chinese pilot
 Leon M. Lontok as Chinese boatman
 Lane Nakano as Driver of jeep
 George T. Lee as Soldier
 Walter Ng as Soldier
 Wing Foo as Soldier
 Alfredo Santos as Guard
 Wei Fan Hsueh as Officer assistant to Kwon
 James B. Leong as Train conductor
 Jung Lim as Train porter
 Rollin Moriyama as Chinese priest
 Si Lan Chen as Old woman
 Gregory Merims as Russian plainclothesman
 William Yip as Chinese nationalist
 Hom Wing Gim as Chinese mess boy
 Weaver Levy as Chinese officer

Production
Peking Express, a remake of Paramount's Shanghai Express credited Harry Hervey for his story and adaptor Jules Furthman on both films. A pre-production news release December 25, 1950 states that the film was also based on screenwriter John Lucas' "original story". An April 1951 item in The New York Times claimed Peking Express was the first Hollywood film, "laid in Communist China." Charlton Heston was originally announced as a co-star for Corinne Calvet. Heston was just beginning to take on leading roles while Joseph Cotten was alternating between supporting and leading roles during this period.

"Modern sources claim that exterior train footage from Shanghai Express was reused in Peking Express." Principal photography took place from late February to late March 1951.

Reception
Peking Express was reviewed in Variety. The review stated, "... An excellent coating of intrigue and action against an Oriental background provides Peking Express with enough thriller melodramatics to satisfy action-minded audiences." In a November 1952 The Hollywood Reporter news item, Peking Express was withdrawn from exhibition in India, after China protested.

References

Notes

Bibliography

 Maltin, Leonard.  Leonard Maltin's Movie Encyclopedia. New York: Dutton, 1994. .

External links
 
 
 
 

1951 films
1951 adventure films
1951 drama films
American black-and-white films
Cold War films
Remakes of American films
Films scored by Dimitri Tiomkin
Films directed by William Dieterle
Films produced by Hal B. Wallis
Films set in China
Paramount Pictures films
Rail transport films
Films with screenplays by Jules Furthman
1950s English-language films